Muan Tideland is a wetland of  located in Muan Hyunkyungmeon, South Korea. Among many tidelands, Muan Tideland is first to be designated as provincial park. It is a wetland designated as Ramsar wetland and as a wetland of international importance.

Current status
Hampyong Gulf, where Muan tideland is located, has a narrow mouth and a large inner part. Due to effects of sand dunes and naturally eroded soils, Muan tideland consists of special geological features. At the edge of the tideland is an alluvial bed and well-developed sea cliff.

Muan tideland is a place where diverse ecology can be seen. With its shallow water and complicated coastline, Muan is a perfect place for many species to prosper. With many sea organisms, Muan is a tideland ecology sightseeing resort. Muan tideland was designated as Ramsar Convention wetland in January 2008.

Organisms in Muan
Plants
 Zoysiagrass
 Foxtail (Setaria viridis)
 Wild oat (Avena fatua)
 Curled dock (Rumex crispus)
 Sea blite (Suaeda asparagoides)
 12 other halophytes
 79 inner water living species

Birds
 Far Eastern curlew (Numenius madagascariensis)
 Long-billed plover (Charadrius placidus)

References

Ramsar sites in South Korea